Alberto Testa may refer to:

Alberto Testa (dancer) (1922–2019), Italian dancer
Alberto Testa (lyricist) (1927–2009), Italian composer and lyricist